The London and North Western Railway (LNWR) Jubilee Class was a class of 4-4-0 4-cylinder compound locomotives by F.W. Webb. A total of forty were built from 1897–1900.

Slightly unusually for the LNWR, the class received a number series, this being 1901–1940.

As with other Webb compounds, they were mechanically unreliable.  As a result, George Whale rebuilt these as two cylinder simple locomotives of the Renown Class, starting with 1918 Renown in 1908.  Rebuilt engines retained their numbers.  Rebuilding continued so that at the grouping of 1923, only 9 Jubilees remained.  These were 1903/4/8/11/12/15/23/27/29.  1908 Royal George was withdrawn in January 1923, but the remaining eight were allocated the LMS numbers 5110–5117, in sequence.  Two, 1904 Rob Roy and 1923 Agamemnon were withdrawn 1923, without receiving new numbers.  The LMS rebuilt the remaining six into Renowns in 1924, making the class extinct.  (Their subsequent history is discussed at LNWR Renown Class).

Locomotive list

References

 

4-4-0 locomotives
Compound locomotives
Jubilee
Railway locomotives introduced in 1897
Scrapped locomotives
Standard gauge steam locomotives of Great Britain